The 2022 United States House of Representatives elections in Maryland were held on November 8, 2022, to elect the eight U.S. representatives from the state of Maryland, one from each of the state's eight congressional districts. The elections coincided with other elections to the House of Representatives, elections to the United States Senate, and various state and local elections. The Democratic and Republican primaries were held on July 19.

District 1

The 1st district encompasses the entire Eastern Shore of Maryland, including Salisbury, Harford County, and parts of north Baltimore County. The incumbent is Republican Andy Harris, who was reelected with 63.4% of the vote in 2020.

Republican primary

Candidates

Nominee
Andy Harris, incumbent U.S. representative

Declined
Barry Glassman, Harford County executive (2014–present) (running for Comptroller)

Endorsements

Results

Democratic primary

Candidates

Nominee
Heather Mizeur, former state delegate for the 20th district (2007–2015) and candidate for governor in 2014

Eliminated in primary
R. David Harden, International Trade consultant and former U.S. diplomat

Withdrawn
Malcolm Thomas Colombo, structural engineer
 Mia Mason, Democratic nominee for Maryland's 1st congressional district in 2020 (endorsed Mizeur)

Endorsements

Results

Libertarian primary

Candidates

Nominee
 Daniel Frank Thibeault

Green Party

Candidates

Withdrawn
 George Gluck, perennial candidate (running in MD06)

General election

Predictions

Polling

Results

Endorsements

District 2
{{Infobox election
| election_name     = 2022 Maryland's 2nd congressional district election
| country           = Maryland
| type              = presidential
| ongoing           = no
| previous_election = 2020 United States House of Representatives elections in Maryland#District 2
| previous_year     = 2020
| next_election     = 2024 United States House of Representatives elections in Maryland#District 2
| next_year         = 2024
| image_size        = x150px
| image1            = Dutch Ruppersberger 2 (cropped).jpg
| nominee1          =  Dutch Ruppersberger
| party1            = Democratic Party (US)
| popular_vote1     =  158,998
| percentage1       =  59.23%
| image2            = 3x4.svg
| nominee2          = Nicolee Ambrose
| party2            = Republican Party (US)
| popular_vote2     = 109,075
| percentage2       = 40.63%
| map_image         = 
| map_size          = 200px
| map_caption       = Ruppersberger:     Ambrose:'   
| title             = U.S. Representative
| before_election   = Dutch Ruppersberger
| before_party      = Democratic Party (US)
| after_election    = Dutch Ruppersberger
| after_party       = Democratic Party (US)
}}

The 2nd district encompasses much of Baltimore and Carroll counties, along with a portion of Baltimore itself. The incumbent is Democrat Dutch Ruppersberger, who was reelected with 67.7% of the vote in 2020.

Democratic primary

Candidates

Nominee
Dutch Ruppersberger, incumbent U.S. representative

Eliminated in primary
George Croom, former campaign manager
Marques Dent
Liri Fusha, nurse

Endorsements

Results

Republican primary

Candidates

Nominee
Nicolee Ambrose, national committeewoman of the Republican Party of Maryland

Eliminated in primary
Berney Flowers, veteran
Michael A. Geppi, former Harford County councilmember (1998–2002), tech executive
Lance Griffin, National Guard veteran
Ellen "EJ" McNulty, public health policy professional
David D. Wallace, business owner and nominee for Maryland's 8th congressional district in 2014

Withdrawn
Yuripzy Morgan, former WBAL radio host (running in MD03)

Declined
 Barry Glassman, Harford County executive (2014–present) (running for comptroller)
 David Marks, Baltimore County council member (2010–present) (running for re-election)

Endorsements

Results

 General election 

 Predictions 

 Polling 

Results

Endorsements

District 3

The 3rd district encompasses all of Howard County, much of Anne Arundel County, including Annapolis, and parts of Carroll County. The incumbent is Democrat John Sarbanes, who was reelected with 69.8% of the vote in 2020.

Democratic primary

Candidates

Nominee
John Sarbanes, incumbent U.S. representative

Eliminated in primary
Ben R. Beardsley
Jake Pretot, army veteran, small business owner, and candidate for Maryland's second congressional district in 2020

Withdrawn
Malcolm Thomas Colombo, structural engineer (running in MD01)
Eselebor Okojie, pharmacist

Endorsements

Results

Republican primary

Candidates

Nominee
Yuripzy Morgan, former WBAL radio host

Eliminated in primary
Thomas E. "Pinkston" Harris, perennial candidate
Joe Kelley, technician
Antonio Pitocco, retail worker and activist
Amal Torres, U.S. Air Force veteran and former military intelligence analyst

Endorsements

Results

 General election 

 Predictions 

Results

Endorsements

District 4

The 4th district encompasses parts of the Washington, D.C. suburbs in Prince George's County, including Landover, Laurel, and Suitland. The incumbent is Democrat Anthony Brown, who was reelected with 79.6% of the vote in 2020.

Democratic primary

Candidates

Nominee
Glenn Ivey, former Prince George's County State Attorney (2002–2011) and candidate for Maryland's 4th congressional district in 2016

Eliminated in primary
Tammy Allison, attorney and candidate for Texas's 6th congressional district in 2021 special election
Angela Angel, former state delegate for the 25th district (2015–2019)
James Curtis Jr., accountant
Donna Edwards, former U.S. Representative for Maryland's 4th congressional district (2008–2017) and candidate for U.S. Senate in 2016
Matthew Fogg, retired Chief Deputy U.S. Marshal, anti-racism and anti-corruption activist, and candidate for Maryland's 4th congressional district in 2016
Gregory Holmes, former Republican candidate for Maryland's 4th congressional district in 2012 and 2014 and for the U.S. Senate in 2016
Robert K. McGhee
Kim A. Shelton, bus operator

Withdrawn
Jazz Lewis, state delegate for the 24th district (2017–present) (running for re-election)

Declined
Anthony Brown, incumbent U.S. representative (running for attorney general)

 Endorsements 

Polling

Results

Republican primary

Candidates

Nominee
Jeff Warner, pastor

Eliminated in primary
Eric Loeb, anti-gerrymandering activist and candidate for this district in 2020
George McDermott, perennial candidate

Results

 General election 

 Predictions 

Results

Endorsements

District 5

The 5th district is based in southern Maryland, and encompasses Charles, St. Mary's, Calvert counties and a small portion of southern Anne Arundel County, as well as the Washington, D.C. suburbs of College Park, Bowie, and Upper Marlboro. The incumbent is Democrat Steny Hoyer, the current House Majority Leader, who was reelected with 68.8% of the vote in 2020.

Democratic primary
Candidates

Nominee
Steny Hoyer, incumbent U.S. Representative and House Majority Leader

Eliminated in primary
Keith Washington, former police officer and felon
Mckayla Wilkes, administrative assistant and candidate for this district in 2020

Withdrawn
Colin Byrd, former mayor of Greenbelt (running for U.S. Senate; endorsed Wilkes)Elaine Sarah Belson, clinical social worker

Endorsements

Results

Republican primary

Candidates

Nominee
Chris Palombi, former police officer and nominee for this district in 2020

Eliminated in primary
Bryan DuVal Cubero, veteran and candidate for this district in 2020
Vanessa Marie Hoffman, businesswoman and Democratic candidate for this district in 2020
Toni Jarboe-Duley, realtor
Michael S. Lemon
Patrick Lucky Stevens
Tannis Villanova, U.S. Marine Corps veteran

Endorsements

Results

 General election 

 Predictions 

Results

Endorsements

District 6

The 6th district is based in western Maryland. It covers all of Garrett, Allegany, Washington, and Frederick counties, and extends south into the Washington, D.C. suburbs in Montgomery County, including Germantown and Gaithersburg. The incumbent is Democrat David Trone, who was reelected with 58.8% of the vote in 2020. After redistricting in 2022, the district became much more competitive, giving up a portion of the heavily Democratic Montgomery County in exchange for a part of more Republican Frederick County.

This district was included on the list of Democratic-held seats that the National Republican Congressional Committee targeted in 2022.

Democratic primary
Candidates

Nominee
David Trone, incumbent U.S. representative

Eliminated in primary
George Gluck, perennial candidate
Ben Smilowitz, founder and executive director of Disaster Accountability Project

Withdrawn
Carleah Summers, executive director of transitional living houses (running for Maryland Senate)

Declined
 Aruna Miller, former state delegate for the 15th district (2010–2019) and candidate for Maryland's 6th congressional district in 2018 (running for lieutenant governor)

Endorsements

Results

Republican primary

Candidates

Nominee
Neil Parrott, state delegate for district 2A (2011–present) and nominee for Maryland's sixth congressional district in 2020

Eliminated in primary
Colt M. Black
Matthew Foldi, journalist at the Washington Free Beacon
Jonathan Jenkins, software engineer
Robert Poissonnier
Mariela Roca, medical logistics specialist and USAF veteran

Withdrawn
David D. Wallace, business owner and nominee for Maryland's 8th congressional district in 2014 (running in MD02)

Declined
Jason C. Buckel, Minority Leader of the Maryland House of Delegates (2021–present) and state delegate for district 1B (2015–present) (running for re-election'')

Endorsements

Results

General election

Predictions

Endorsements

Polling 

David Trone vs. Jason Buckel

Generic Democrat vs. generic Republican

Results

District 7

The 7th district includes most of Baltimore and some of its suburbs. The incumbent is Democrat Kweisi Mfume, who was reelected with 71.6% of the vote in 2020.

Democratic primary

Candidates

Nominee
Kweisi Mfume, incumbent U.S. representative

Eliminated in primary
Tashi Kimandus Davis, navy veteran
Elihu Eli El
Wayne McNeal

Endorsements

Results

Republican primary

Candidates

Nominee
Scott M. Collier, perennial candidate

Eliminated in primary
Ray Bly, candidate for Maryland's 7th congressional district in 2016, 2018, and 2020, candidate for Maryland's 2nd congressional district in 2012
Michael Pearson, candidate for Maryland's 7th congressional district in 2018
Lorrie Sigley, nurse

Results

General election

Predictions

Results

Endorsements

District 8

The 8th district encompasses the inner suburbs of Washington, D.C., and is located entirely within Montgomery County. The incumbent is Democrat Jamie Raskin, who was reelected with 68.2% of the vote in 2020.

Democratic primary

Candidates

Nominee
Jamie Raskin, incumbent U.S. representative

Eliminated in primary
 Andalib Odulate, progressive activist

Endorsements

Results

Republican primary

Candidates

Nominee
Gregory Coll, nominee for Maryland's 8th congressional district in 2020

Eliminated in primary
Michael Mihirate Yadeta, engineer

Endorsements

Results

Libertarian primary

Candidates

Nominee
Andrés Garcia, software consultant

General election

Predictions

Results

Endorsements

Notes

Partisan clients

See also

 2022 United States Senate election in Maryland
 2022 Maryland gubernatorial election
 2022 Maryland Attorney General election
 2022 Maryland Comptroller election

References

External links
Official campaign websites for 1st district candidates
 Andy Harris (R) for Congress
 Heather Mizeur (D) for Congress

Official campaign websites for 2nd district candidates
 Nicolee Ambrose (R) for Congress
 Dutch Ruppersberger (D) for Congress

Official campaign websites for 3rd district candidates
 Yuripzy Morgan (R) for Congress
 John Sarbanes (D) for Congress

Official campaign websites for 4th district candidates
 Glenn Ivey (D) for Congress
 Jeff Warner (R) for Congress

Official campaign websites for 5th district candidates
 Steny Hoyer (D) for Congress
 Chris Palombi (R) for Congress

Official campaign websites for 6th district candidates
 Neil Parrott (R) for Congress
 David Trone (D) for Congress

Official campaign websites for 7th district candidates
 Kweisi Mfume (D) for Congress

Official campaign websites for 8th district candidates
 Gregory Coll (R) for Congress
 Andrés Garcia (L) for Congress
 Jamie Raskin (D) for Congress

2022
Maryland
United States House of Representatives